Julia Parker may refer to:

Julia Parker (astrologer) (born 1932), British astrologer
Julia F. Parker (born 1928), Pomo-Miwok basket weaver from California